This article contains a list of major international wire services.

See also
 List of press release agencies

References

News agencies by country